Hannibal is a 1959 Italian historical adventure film based on the life of Hannibal, starring Victor Mature in the title role. The film was directed by Edgar G. Ulmer and Carlo Ludovico Bragaglia. It marks the first film pairing of Terence Hill and Bud Spencer under their real names. However they only appear in supporting roles and have no scenes in common.

Plot
The film begins with the Roman Senate hearing about Hannibal (Victor Mature) crossing the Alps with his men and many elephants. The crossing is difficult, with many men dying en route, but they manage to pass through, in part because Hannibal forms an allegiance with a local chieftain.

Hannibal's troops capture Sylvia, niece of Roman senator Fabius Maximus, and she and Hannibal fall in love. Some of Hannibal's troops oppose the match and an unsuccessful attempt is made on Sylvia's life. Hannibal also loses an eye during battle.

Despite the warnings of Fabius, who suggests avoiding battle and waging a campaign of exhaustion, the decision is made to fight Hannibal out in the open. The consequence is a massive Roman defeat at Cannae.

Fabius is recalled to lead the Roman Army and the momentum of Hannibal's campaign begins to wane. His wife and child arrive from Carthage. Sylvia returns to Rome and commits suicide. A postscript informs us that Hannibal fought on for many more years in other lands.

Cast
Victor Mature as Hannibal
Gabriele Ferzetti as Fabius Maximus
Rita Gam as Sylvia
Milly Vitale as Danila
Rik Battaglia as Asdrubale
Franco Silva as Maharbal
Terence Hill as Quintilius (billed under his real name, Mario Girotti)
Mirko Ellis as Magician
Andrea Aureli as Gajus Terentius Varro
Andrea Fantasia as Console Paulus Emilius
Bud Spencer as Rutario (billed under his real name, Carlo Pedersoli)
Renzo Cesana
Mario Pisu
Enzo Fiermonte

Production
Despite being an Italian production the film was mainly financed by American studio Warner Brothers.

Victor Mature signed to make the film with Liber Films of Rome in March 1959. Filming took place in October of that year with a reported budget of $2.5 million. Edgar Ulmer was the American representative of the company.

The only English speaking actors in the film were Victor Mature and Rita Gam, all the other actors were Italian and had their lines dubbed into English. The film featured approximately 20,000 extras.

The film was originally intended to be a more personal account of Hannibal's life, but the studio instead pressured the film makers into developing a more standard historical film. The film was directed by Edgar G. Ulmer, although IMDB lists Carlo Ludovico Bragaglia as a co-director. The film was released theatrically in the USA on 18 June 1960.

The film existed in two versions, a 95-minute version released in non-English speaking European countries, and a 103-minute version released in the US and other English speaking territories. The films tagline was "Jump on! Hang on! Here comes the avenging Hannibal and his crazed elephant army!" The film's music was composed by Carlo Rustichelli.

Release
Hannibal was released in Italy on 21 December 1959 and in the United States on 18 June 1960.

DVD release
The film was released on DVD in the USA on October 19, 2004. The DVD includes 16:9 format, a 33-minute interview with Edgar G. Ulmer, a photo and poster gallery, the theatrical trailer, and cast and crew biographies. The DVD contains no subtitles.

References

Footnotes

Sources

External links

 
 

1959 films
1950s historical adventure films
1950s biographical films
Italian historical adventure films
Italian biographical films
1950s English-language films
English-language Italian films
1950s Italian-language films
Peplum films
Films directed by Edgar G. Ulmer
Films directed by Carlo Ludovico Bragaglia
Films scored by Carlo Rustichelli
Films set in the Roman Empire
Films set in Tunisia
Films set in Spain
Films set in Italy
Films set in the Alps
Films shot in Serbia
Films about elephants
Second Punic War films
Cultural depictions of Hannibal
Warner Bros. films
Sword and sandal films
1950s multilingual films
Italian multilingual films
1950s Italian films